Eurhinus is a genus of beetles. The genus was first described by Johann Karl Wilhelm Illiger in 1808

Taxonomy
Eurhinus contains the following species:
 Eurhinus aeruginosa
 Eurhinus atritarsis
 Eurhinus aureus
 Eurhinus cavilobus
 Eurhinus convexa
 Eurhinus cupratus
 Eurhinus cupripes
 Eurhinus festivus
 Eurhinus flaturarius
 Eurhinus magnificus
 Eurhinus occultus
 Eurhinus viridicolor
 Eurhinus viridipes
 Eurhinus viridis
 Eurhinus yucatecus

References

Taxa named by Johann Karl Wilhelm Illiger
Weevils
Weevil genera